Miltochrista punicea is a moth of the family Erebidae. It was described by Frederic Moore in 1878. It is found in the Indian state of Sikkim and Myanmar.

References

punicea
Moths described in 1878
Moths of Asia